Yaghli Bolagh (also Romanized as Yāghlī Bolāgh) is a village in Quri Chay-ye Sharqi Rural District, in the Central District of Charuymaq County, East Azerbaijan Province, Iran. At the 2006 census, its population was 73, in 14 families.

References 

Populated places in Charuymaq County